The 1984 Australian Rally Championship was a series of six rallying events held across Australia. It was the 17th season in the history of the competition.

David Officer and navigator Kate Officer in the Mitsubishi Galant won the 1984 Championship, becoming the first husband and wife team to win the championship.

Season review
The 17th Australian Rally Championship was held over six events across Australia, the season consisting of one event each for Queensland  and Western Australia and two each  for New South Wales and  Victoria.  It was an unusual season, with very little manufacturer backing and a mix of classes with the introduction of the Production Rally Car category.

The Rallies
The six events of the 1984 season were as follows.

Round One – The Canon Zodiac  Rally

Production Rally Cars

Round Two – Mid-State Television Rally

Production Rally Cars

Round Three – James Hardie National Rally

Production Rally Cars

Round Four – Sunday Times Safari

Production Rally Cars

Round Five – Dunlop 2GO Rally

Production Rally Cars

Round Six – Enka-Fill Alpine Rally

Production Rally Cars

1984 Drivers and Navigators Championships
Final pointscore for 1984 is as follows.

David Officer – Champion Driver 1984

Kate Officer – Champion Navigator 1984

References

External links
  Results of Snowy Mountains Rally and ARC results.

Rally Championship
Rally competitions in Australia
1984 in rallying